Spilosoma yemenensis is a moth in the family Erebidae. It was described by George Hampson in 1916. It is found in Yemen.

References

Spilosoma yemenensis at EOL
Spilosoma yemenensis at Markku Savela's Lepidoptera and Some Other Life Forms
Spilosoma yemenensis at BHL

Moths described in 1916
yemenensis